Science & Vie Junior is a French science magazine targeting children. The magazine is published by Mondadori France, a subsidiary of the Italian media company Mondadori. The headquarters of the magazine is in Paris.

History
Science & Vie Junior was started in 1989. The magazine is published on a monthly basis. The magazine is a spin-off of Science & Vie made for teenagers. In 2010, it won the Grand prix des Médias. In 2012 the circulation of the monthly was 166,451 copies.

Sections of Science & Vie Junior
The magazine has three main parts.
 L'actu
 100% Science
 MySVJ

L'actu 
L'actu is the first section of the magazine. The main part of this section is news.

Cucaracha 
Cucaracha is a comic in the L'actu section of the magazine. It is the first part of the section. It is about lives of cockroaches in human society. It was made by Marino Degano, and Laurent Salles.

Cucaracha cockroach is endowed with reason. With his small telescope, she is passionate about the sky and stars. But sometimes strange shadows infest his field of vision; these are Zoms who are struggling with frenzy. So rather than wait for the view emerges the heroine begins to watch them with a look relevant and sometimes critical.

The moral of this story... cockroaches need only be patient. One day the other, and will destroy the Zoms that day, they become "masters of the world".

Cucaracha is published monthly since November 2001 on the first page in Science et Vie Junior. The website presents a small selection of these stories.

Tout en images 
Tout en images (All in images) is a part of L'actu. It compiles many pictures of an event. Then there are captions of one medium-sized paragraph. Tout en images takes seven pages most of the time.

Others 
Another section explains news of different sciences. It also has one citation from a person, and a piece of statistics. That is called "Le nombre" (The number). There is also a place called textos with no images. Just text. Also, there is a fake interview that has as example anti-hydrogen.

100% Sciences 
100% Sciences is another section of the magazine. It has what is similar to the "Tout en images" but with less images. After, there are many long articles with one comic, experiments, technology tips, and math magic.

MySVJ 
This section that means "My Science & Vie Junior". In this section, there is:
 Articles
 Reviews
 An invention
 Questions
 comics

References

External links 

 Official site

1989 establishments in France
Children's magazines published in France
French-language magazines
Magazines established in 1989
Magazines published in Paris
Monthly magazines published in France
Science and technology magazines
Arnoldo Mondadori Editore